George Rand may refer to:

 George Du Rand (born 1982), South African swimmer
 George D. Rand (1833–?), American architect